Zeb is an unincorporated community and census-designated place (CDP) in Cherokee County, Oklahoma, United States. The population was 497 at the 2010 census.

Geography

Demographics

As of the 2010 United States Census, there were 497 people residing in Zeb.  The population density was 58 people per square mile (22/km2).  There were 217 housing units at an average density of 23/sq mi (9/km2). The racial makeup of the CDP was 55.42% White, 0.20% African American, 34.94% Native American, 0.20% Asian, and 9.24% from two or more races.

There were 179 households, out of which 37.4% had children under the age of 18 living with them, 70.4% were married couples living together, 6.7% had a female householder with no husband present, and 19.6% were non-families. 14.5% of all households were made up of individuals, and 6.7% had someone living alone who was 65 years of age or older. The average household size was 2.78 and the average family size was 3.10.

In the CDP, the population was spread out, with 27.1% under the age of 18, 9.4% from 18 to 24, 27.3% from 25 to 44, 25.9% from 45 to 64, and 10.2% who were 65 years of age or older. The median age was 34 years. For every 100 females, there were 98.4 males. For every 100 females age 18 and over, there were 93.1 males.

The median income for a household in the CDP was $32,500, and the median income for a family was $38,750. Males had a median income of $28,125 versus $22,250 for females. The per capita income for the CDP was $14,547. About 13.5% of families and 15.6% of the population were below the poverty line, including 16.9% of those under age 18 and 16.3% of those age 65 or over.

References

Census-designated places in Cherokee County, Oklahoma
Census-designated places in Oklahoma